Electricity: OMD with the Royal Liverpool Philharmonic Orchestra is a concert film by Orchestral Manoeuvres in the Dark (OMD) with the Royal Liverpool Philharmonic Orchestra. The concert was recorded on 20 June 2009 at the Philharmonic Hall in Liverpool. The DVD was released on 14 December 2009.

The concert featured the orchestral premiere of "The Energy Suite", followed by a selection of OMD songs with orchestral backing fronted by Andy McCluskey and Paul Humphreys. The music was arranged for the orchestra by Gary Carpenter, Ian Stephens, Deborah Mollison, Louis Johnson, and Ian Gardiner. The orchestra was conducted by Clark Rundell.

The Energy Suite
"The Energy Suite" is an installation project created by artist Peter Saville, OMD member Andy McCluskey and filmmaker Hambi Haralambous. It is made of visual and audible art, displaying film footage that captures the architecture and sounds of five power stations in England and Wales. It was on display at FACT in Liverpool, from  until .

The power stations featured are:
 Gas: Point of Ayr Gas Terminal and Connah's Quay Power Station
 Water: Dinorwig Hydro-Electric Power Station (Electric Mountain)
 Air: North Hoyle Bank Wind Turbine Farm
 Nuclear: Heysham Nuclear Power Site
 Coal: Fiddler's Ferry Coal Fired Power Station

Track listing

References

External links
 FACT TV interview with Saville, McCluskey and Haralambous
 

Orchestral Manoeuvres in the Dark albums
2009 live albums
2009 video albums
Concert films